The Chicago based trio Alert312 is made up by 3 musical brothers who have channeled their eclectic roots and faith to craft genuine sonic and visual art. Now in their 3rd season of creative endeavors, the music is mature and expresses the mash up of culture that continues to influence their sound. Authentic live performance is their muse. Faith in Christ is core to their creative motivation. A percussive core drives their energy. Live analogue recording blankets their sound. All three members – Esteban Shedd  // "EB" (MC), Aaron Lopez //  "MRL ONE" (DRUMMER/DJ/PRODUCER) & Loren La Luz // "Lolo" ( PERCUSSIONIST) touch multiple instruments to mash their sonic offerings together – a mofongo of heart, soul and lyrical depth. These are the ingredients of their sound – street funk, progressive Hip Hop yet unashamedly Golden era and ethnic. Experience the live set, grab the sounds, peep their heart. Great craft takes time to mature, the best offerings are now here from the trio.

They have released six studio albums: Alert (2009), Indian Colors (2010), Of Vice & Virtue (2013), The Upside Eternal (2015), Joy King Supreme (2018) and Out of the Tension... Comes Beauty (2020). They have released two extended plays: Red Opus .45 (2011) and Singular Vision (2014).

Background
The Christian hip hop duo of MC Boogalu, whose name is Esteban Paul Shedd (born April 4, 1983), and DJ Moral One, whose name is Aaron Daniel Lopez (born February 25, 1983), met while they were students at Moody Bible Institute in Chicago, Illinois, where they both graduated in 2006, eventually forming the duo in 2009. The duo started out as Alert, yet changed their name to Alert312 to make their music easily identifiable, with the 312 part of their name taken from the local telephone area code. They run a ministry in Chicago called Streetlights to facilitate literacy development while instilling and infusing biblical values alongside. This ministry is part of a greater organization, GRIP Outreach for Youth, where Shedd is a project director, and Lopez is an assistant manager. Shedd is married and has a son, and all three are members of Armitage Baptist Church. Lopez is married to Susana, and both are members of New Life Community Church in Near West Side (Tri-Taylor).

Music history
Their music recording career started with the release of two independently-made studio albums, Alert, on January 11, 2009, and, Indian Colors, on September 1, 2010. The next three releases occurred through Humble Beast Records. Red Opus .45, an extended play, their last release as Alert, was released on April 5, 2011. Of Vice & Virtue, a studio album, was released on January 29, 2013. Another extended play, Singular Vision, came out  on July 1, 2014. Alert 312's latest release, The Upside Eternal, a studio album, was on October 30, 2015, through their own, newly created label HiFi Native Records.

Members
 :EB - vocals - Esteban Paul Shedd (born April 4, 1983)
 DJ Moral One - drums & producer - Aaron Daniel Lopez (born February 25, 1983)
 LoLo - live percussion - Loren La Luz (born June 29, 1983)

Discography
Studio albums
 Alert (January 11, 2009, as Alert)
 Indian Colors (September 1, 2010, as Alert)
 Of Vice & Virtue (January 29, 2013, Humble Beast)
 The Upside Eternal (October 30, 2015, HiFi Native)
 Joy King Supreme (September 7, 2018, Humble Beast)
EPs
 Red Opus .45 (April 5, 2011, as Alert)
 Singular Vision (July 1, 2014, Humble Beast)

References

External links
 
 Wade-O Radio interview

2009 establishments in Illinois
American musical duos
American hip hop groups
Christian hip hop groups
Hip hop duos
Musical groups from Chicago
Musical groups established in 2009